William Wigley (28 November 1870 – 4 December 1937) was a New Zealand cricketer. He played in twenty-two first-class matches for Canterbury from 1893 to 1904.

See also
 List of Canterbury representative cricketers

References

External links
 

1870 births
1937 deaths
New Zealand cricketers
Canterbury cricketers
Cricketers from Christchurch